Richarville is a commune in the Essonne department in Île-de-France in northern France.

Inhabitants of Richarville are known as Richarvillois.

See also
 Communes of the Essonne department

References

External links

Mayors of Essonne Association 

Communes of Essonne